First Demo Tape is an archival release of recordings by the American hardcore punk band Minor Threat. It was released on CD and 7-inch vinyl in 2003 through Dischord Records. The album comprises previously unreleased demo versions of material which appears on the band's subsequent recordings.

Track listing

Personnel
 Ian MacKaye – lead vocals
 Lyle Preslar – guitar
 Brian Baker – bass guitar
 Jeff Nelson – drums
 Henry Garfield - backing vocals

References

External links
 Dischord Records page

Dischord Records EPs